Since 1998, a play-off system has been used to determine the Super League champions. The format has changed over the years, starting with a play-off involving first five, then six teams, eight, four and currently back to six. The play-off series culminates in the Super League Grand Final. Use of a play-off system to decide the Championship brought back a rugby league tradition that had previously fallen out of use. The Super League Premiership, which had previously taken place between the highest placed teams in the competition, was discontinued after the introduction of the Super League play-off series. This was because its purpose  had been to take the place of the previous Championship-deciding play-off system.

Current play-Off system

2002–2008, 2020–2022: top six

From Super League VII in 2002 until Super League XIII in 2008, a play-off series involving the top six teams was used to determine the winners the  Super League champions. Excluding the Grand Final, all matches were staged at the home ground of the team that finished higher in the final league table.

A similar system was used by the Australian National Soccer League and the A-League to decide its champions. From Week Two onwards, the top-six play-offs system reflects exactly the Page playoff system.

The top-six Super League play-off structure:

Week one

 Elimination Semi-final A: 3rd vs 6th
 Elimination Semi-final B: 4th vs 5th

Week two

 Semi-final 1: 1st vs winner of ESFA
 Semi-final 2: 2nd vs winner of ESFB

Week three

 Grand final: winners of semi-final 1 vs winners of semi-final 2

Grand final

Previous play-off systems

1998–2001, 2019: top five
The top-five play-off system is the most simple since their introduction in 1998. The top four teams qualify, the League Leaders play at home to 4th, 2nd then play at home to 3rd with the winners of both semi finals advancing to the Grand Final.
The system was previously used between 1998 and 2005 and again in 2019. The same system was used in the NSWRL's Sydney Competition 1973-1994, the Australian Super League in its only season 1997, the VFL, 1972–1990 and New Zealand's Lion Red Cup, 1994–1996, and Bartercard Cup, 2000-2006.

▼
 
From week two on the top-five play-offs system reflected exactly the Page playoff system.
 
The top-five Super League play-off structure:
 
Week one
 
 Qualification Final: 2nd vs 3rd
 Elimination Final: 4th vs 5th
 Bye: 1st
 
Week two
 
 Major Semi-final: 1st vs winners of qualification final
 Minor Semi-final: losers of qualification final vs winners of elimination final
 
Week three
 
 Preliminary Final: losers of major semi-final vs winners of minor semi-final
 Bye: Winners of major semi-final
 
Week four
 
 Grand final: winners of major semi-final vs winners of preliminary final

2002-2008: top six

From Super League VII in 2002 until Super League XIII in 2008, a play-off series involving the top six teams was used to determine the winners the  Super League champions. Excluding the Grand Final, all matches were staged at the home ground of the team that finished higher in the final league table.

A similar system was used by the Australian National Soccer League and the A-League to decide its champions. From Week Two onwards, the top-six play-offs system reflects exactly the Page playoff system.

The top-six Super League play-off structure:

Week one

 Elimination semi-final A: 3rd vs 6th
 Elimination semi-final B: 4th vs 5th

Week two

 Qualification match: 1st vs 2nd
 Elimination final: winners of elimination semi-final A vs winners of elimination semi-final B

Week three

 Final qualifier: losers of qualification match vs winners of elimination final

Week four

 Grand final: winners of qualification match vs winners of final qualifier

2009-2014: top eight
For the Super League XIV season in 2009, a top-eight play-off system was introduced to replace the previous top-six system. This change coincided with an expansion of the competition from twelve to fourteen teams following the introduction of Super League licensing. The format was introduced following consultation and discussion with all 14 member clubs in Super League. The series lasted four weeks, culminating in the Grand Final at Old Trafford during October.

Week 1

Four matches took place on Week One, effectively in two pools: the Qualifying Play-Offs and the Elimination Play-Offs.

Week 1: Qualifying Play-Offs

These matches involved the teams who finish in the top four.
They were:

1st v 4th
2nd v 3rd

The winners of these two games progressed directly to Week 3. The highest ranked winning club earned Club Call, whereby they chose their opponents in Week 3.

The losers of these two matches received another chance in Week 2 when they were at home to the winners of the Week 1 Elimination Play-Offs.

Week 1: Elimination Play-Offs

These matches involved the teams who finish from fourth through eighth.
They were:

5th v 8th
6th v 7th

The winners of both matches progressed to Week 2; losers were eliminated.

Week 2: Preliminary Semi-Finals

There were two matches in Week 2; the winner of each match progressed to Week 3 and the loser was eliminated.

The first Preliminary Semi-Final featured the highest ranked Qualifying Play-Off loser (from Week 1) v the lowest ranked Elimination Play-Off Winner (also from Week 1).
The second Preliminary Semi-Final featured the lowest ranked Qualifying Play-Off loser (from Week 1) v the highest ranked Elimination Play-Off Winner (also from Week 1).

Week 3

Week 3 also featured two matches; the winner of each match progresses to the grand final and the loser is eliminated.

Week 3: club call

Club call took place following the second weekend of the play-offs and was hosted by the highest ranked winning club from Week 1.

The host club selected whom they would play in Week 3, and could only select from the winners of the two preliminary semi-finals (Week 2) – they could not choose the other qualifying play-offs winner.

The highest ranked club from the qualifying play-offs (Week one) were required to choose their opponents – they could not cede the responsibility to the other Qualifying Play-offs winner.

The team with club call and the other qualifying play-off winners from week 1 were guaranteed home advantage in week 3. For example, if the teams that ended the regular season in 1st and 2nd place lost their opening play-off matches, they could still find themselves playing away to the 3rd or 4th placed teams in week 3.

Week 3: qualifying semi-finals

The first qualifying semi-final featured the highest ranked Qualifying play-Off winner (from Week 1) v the team selected through Club Call.
The second qualifying semi-final featured the lowest ranked Qualifying play-Off winner (from Week 1) v the team not selected through club call.

Week 4: grand final
The two winning teams from week 3 contested the grand final to determine the First Utility Super League champions.

FAQs:

Can any team have club call?
No. The highest ranked winning club from Week 1 will have club call, whereby they choose their opponents in week 3. Only a team that ended the regular season in 1st, 2nd or 3rd can win club call.

Will the teams who finished 1st or 2nd at the end of the regular season be guaranteed home advantage in Week 3 should they progress?
No. The two highest rank teams after Week 1 (the team with club call and the other qualifying play-off winners) are guaranteed home advantage in week 3. For example, should the teams that ended the regular season in 1st and 2nd place lose their opening play-off match, they could still find themselves playing away to the 3rd or 4th placed teams in week 3.

Does the Club Call team have to choose their opponents or can they relinquish the responsibility to the other Qualifying Play-offs winner?
The highest ranked club from the Qualifying Play-offs (Week 1) must choose their opponents – they cannot relinquish the responsibility to the other Qualifying Play-offs winner. In addition, they can only select from the winners of the two Preliminary Semi-finals (Week 2) – they cannot choose the other Qualifying Play-offs winner.

2015–2018: top four
The top-four play-off system was the most simple since their introduction in 1998. The top four teams qualify, the League Leaders play at home to 4th, 2nd then play at home to 3rd with the winners of both semi finals advancing to the Grand Final.

Play-off apps
Only St. Helens have competed in every play-off series since 1998.

Bold – won the grand final

Play-off results

See also
 NRL finals system
 AFL final eight system
 McIntyre system
 McIntyre final eight system

References

Play-offs